Sabine Bergmann-Pohl (née Schulz; ; born 20 April 1946) is a German doctor and politician. A member of the Christian Democratic Union of Germany (CDU), she was president of the People's Chamber of East Germany from April to October 1990. During this time, she was also the interim head of state of East Germany, holding both posts until the state's merger into West Germany in October. She was the youngest, first female and last head of state of East Germany. After the reunification of Germany, she served in the government of Chancellor Helmut Kohl, first as one of many Minister for Special Affairs appointed to provide representation for the last East German government in the Kohl cabinet, then as Parliamentary State Secretary in the Ministry of Health for the remainder of Chancellor Kohl's time in office.

Early life and education 
She was born as Sabine Schulz in Eisenach, Thuringia. After leaving school in 1964, Bergmann-Pohl was initially not admitted to university and entered a two-year internship at the Institute of Forensic Medicine at the Humboldt University in East Berlin. In 1966, she began to study medicine and graduated in 1972 with a diploma in medicine. From 1979, she worked as a lung specialist and in 1980 earned a medical doctorate.

From 1980 to 1985, she was medical director of the polyclinic department for lung diseases, and tuberculosis in Berlin-Friedrichshain. From 1985 to 1990, she was medical director at the District Office for lung diseases and tuberculosis in East Berlin.

Since 1990, Bergmann-Pohl has been the Patron of the General Disabled Persons in Germany (ABID eV) and since 2003 President of the Berlin Red Cross. Also since 2003 she has been a member of the Presidium of the International Federation and has been a vice president since 2007.

Political career

In 1981, she joined the East German CDU, one of the bloc parties of the GDR, and in 1987 was elected to the district board in East Berlin.

In the general election of March 1990, the only free and fair election ever held in East Germany, she was elected to the People's Chamber, which on 5 April elected her its president. On the same day, parliament also abolished the State Council, the country's collective presidency. Under the Constitution, the president of the People's Chamber was ex officio vice president of the GDR; as such, Bergmann-Pohl assumed the role of interim head of state as well.  In that role, she presided over the People's Chamber formally petitioning to join the Federal Republic of Germany on 23 August, as well as the overwhelming approval of the unification treaty on 12 September.

After German reunification on 3 October 1990, she became a member of the Bundestag and, along with other leading members of the last East German government, was also appointed Federal Minister for Special Affairs in Chancellor Helmut Kohl's cabinet.

After the 1990 all-German election, she was appointed Parliamentary Secretary in the Federal Ministry for Health on 18 January 1991. Following her party's defeat in the 1998 election, she departed from the government on 27 October 1998 but remained in the Bundestag until 2002.

Personal life
Sabine Bergmann-Pohl was married to Ulrich Pohl from 1972 to 1979. They have two sons together. Since 1990 she is married to Jürgen Bergmann. She is a Protestant.

Offices
Parliamentary mandates
Member of the People's Chamber of the GDR (1990)
President of the People's Chamber (1990)
Member of the German Bundestag (1990–2002)
Government Offices
Federal Minister for Special Affairs (1990–1991)
Parliamentary State Secretary in the Ministry of Health (1991–1998)

Writings
Frequency of a history and clinical findings of chronic obstructive pulmonary disease in childhood, their relationship to lung function and determination of reference values for the ventilation and distribution parameters on Pneumotestgerät. Results of a school investigation. Dissertation Academy for Medical Training of East Berlin, 1981, Berlin-Karow, 1976.
Farewell without tears. Looking back at the year of the Unification. Recorded by Dietrich von Thadden. Ullstein, Berlin – Frankfurt/Main, 1991 
Sabine Bergmann-Pohl & Paul B. Wink (ed.): Panel Discussion 1953-1989: Germany on the way to unity and freedom on the occasion of the 50th Anniversary of the uprising in East Germany on 17 June 2003 at the Academy of the Konrad Adenauer Foundation in Berlin, Konrad-Adenauer-Stiftung, Berlin 2004 
Sabine Bergmann-Pohl & Wilhelm Staudacher (ed.): "The cry for freedom." The Hungarian Revolution of 1956, Konrad-Adenauer-Stiftung, Berlin 2007

References

External links
Profile at Bundestag.de

|-

1946 births
Christian Democratic Union (East Germany) politicians
Female heads of state
Female members of the Bundestag
Female members of the Volkskammer
German Protestants
Federal government ministers of Germany
Leaders of East Germany
Presidents of the Volkskammer
Living people
Members of the Bundestag for Berlin
Members of the Bundestag 1998–2002
Members of the Bundestag 1994–1998
Members of the Bundestag 1990–1994
Members of the Bundestag 1987–1990
Members of the 10th Volkskammer
People from Eisenach
Women federal government ministers of Germany
Members of the Bundestag for the Christian Democratic Union of Germany
21st-century German women politicians